was a town located in Naoiri District, Ōita Prefecture, Japan.

As of 2003, the town had an estimated population of 2,816 and the density of 33.59 persons per km2. The total area was 83.83 km2.

On April 1, 2005, Naoiri, along with the towns of Kujū and Ogi (all from Naoiri District), was merged into the expanded city of Taketa.

Dissolved municipalities of Ōita Prefecture